Charles Owen Hezlet, DSO (16 May 1891 – 22 November 1965) was an Irish amateur golfer and part-time soldier. He was runner-up in the 1914 Amateur Championship and was in the British Walker Cup team in 1924, 1926 and 1928.

Military career
Hezlet was commissioned into the part-time Antrim Royal Garrison Artillery (Special Reserve) in 1911, served during World War I and won a DSO while commanding a siege battery in 1918. He ended the war with the rank of Major. He was re-commissioned on the outbreak of World War II and on 1 December 1940 he took command of the newly-formed 66th Light Anti-Aircraft Regiment, Royal Artillery, at Belfast. Shortly afterwards he was promoted to Lieutenant-Colonel and commanded the regiment during the Belfast Blitz, He remained in command until May 1942, after the regiment had crossed to Kent to train for active service overseas.

Golf career
In 1914 he was runner-up in the Amateur Championship, losing 3&2 to James Jenkins. He was also runner-up in the 1923 and 1925 Irish Amateur Open Championship and the 1923 Welsh Open Amateur Championship. He won the Irish Amateur Open Championship in 1926 and 1929 and was in the Walker Cup team in 1924, 1926 and 1928. He was also a member of a team of four amateurs that played in South Africa in 1927/28.

Amateur wins
1920 Irish Amateur Close Championship
1926 Irish Amateur Open Championship
1929 Irish Amateur Open Championship

Results in major championships

Note: Hezlet only played in the Open Championship.

CUT = missed the half-way cut

Team appearances
Amateur
Walker Cup (representing Great Britain): 1924, 1926, 1928

Family
Hezlet had three sisters who were also well-known amateur golfers: May, Violet and Florence. Hezlet married Annie Maitland Stuart in 1920. She died of pneumonia in Cannes, France, in 1931 aged 30.

References

External links
 

Irish male golfers
Amateur golfers
People from Sheerness
British Army personnel of World War I
British Army personnel of World War II
Royal Artillery officers
Royal Garrison Artillery officers
Companions of the Distinguished Service Order
Deaths from pneumonia in England
1891 births
1965 deaths